Medina Independent School District is a public school district based in the community of Medina, Texas (USA).  Located in Bandera County, a small portion of the district extends into Kerr County.

In 2009, the school district was rated "academically acceptable" by the Texas Education Agency.

Schools
In the 2012-2013 school year, the district had students in two schools. 
 
Medina High School (Grades 7-12)
Medina Elementary School (Grades EE-6)

References

External links
 

School districts in Bandera County, Texas
School districts in Kerr County, Texas